Oannes may refer to:
 Oannes (bug), an insect genus in the tribe Coreini
 Oannes (mythology), Greek name for Uanna, an Upkallu in Mesopotamian myth